Danube Private University is a private university located in Krems an der Donau, Austria. The university was founded on 13 August 2009. The university was established in 2009.

References

External links 
 

Educational institutions established in 2009
Private universities and colleges in Austria
2009 establishments in Austria